John Dahlgren may refer to:
 John A. Dahlgren, United States Navy officer
 John Olof Dahlgren, United States Marine Corps corporal and Medal of Honor recipient
 John Vinton Dahlgren, American lawyer